Beirut Air Base ( Kaidat Bayrut al-jawiya) is a military base owned by the Lebanese Armed Forces and operated by the Lebanese Air Force. It is located 9 km (5.6 mi) from the city center in the southern suburbs of Beirut, Lebanon.

Currently, the Lebanese Air Force occupies part of the west end of the Beirut Rafic Hariri International Airport and has been the base of most of the helicopter force for almost 50 years, which include the Hawker Hunters, Fouga Magisters and other aircraft during certain periods.

History
After the formation of the air force, the Beirut Air Base was established in 1950. During the early years, Rayak was the main air base; however, the air force wanted to establish another air base close to the capital and after studying most of the areas around Beirut, it was concluded that the new site for the Beirut International airport in Khalde was best fit.

Inventory

 30 Huey II Helicopters
 2 Twin Huey Helicopters (3 more to be restored)
 3 Cessna 208 Caravan close air support planes
 AW139 Presidential Helicopter

The Twin Huey's will have multiple role purposes like fire-fighting, utility and patrolling the ocean to protect the oil extraction as well as modifications for light attack purposes.

See also

 Rayak Air Base
 Rene Mouawad Air Base

References

Airports in Lebanon
Lebanese Air Force bases
Military airbases established in 1950